Rotha is a feminine given name and surname. It may refer to:

 Rotha Johnston (born 1959), Northern Irish entrepreneur
 Rotha Lintorn-Orman (1895–1935), founder of the British Fascisti, the first avowedly fascist movement in British politics
 Paul Rotha (1907–1984), British documentary film-maker, film historian and critic
 Wanda Rotha (1901–1982), Austrian stage actress

Feminine given names